Churapanovo (Surapan) is a rural locality (a village) in Seytyakovsky Selsoviet, Baltachevsky District, Bashkortostan, Russia. The population was 44 as of 2010. There are 4 streets.

Geography 
Churapanovo is located 7 km west of Starobaltachevo (the district's administrative centre) by road. Seytakovo is the nearest rural locality.

References 

Rural localities in Baltachevsky District